Eleanor Virden Jackson Piel (September 22, 1920 – November 26, 2022) was an American civil rights lawyer. She entered civil rights law after United States v. Masaaki Kuwabara, a case where interned Japanese Americans were tried for declining to be drafted. She practiced law until she was in her early 90s.

Education
Jackson Piel attended the University of California, Los Angeles and then transferred to University of California, Berkeley, graduating with a BA in 1940. She applied to the Berkeley law school, but was denied admission. She was told by the interviewing dean that “females always had nervous breakdowns.” She attended the University of Southern California school of law for one year and then transferred to Berkeley where she graduated from in 1943. She was the only woman in the graduating class, and in 1970 she talked with the New York Times about the barriers women lawyers faced.

Career
Jackson Piel clerked for Judge Louis E. Goodman of the Federal District Court in San Francisco. In 1964, she represented Sandra Adickes in the case of Adickes v. S. H. Kress & Co. In 1999, she worked for ten years to free a man from Buffalo after DNA testing showed that he was innocent.

Awards and honors
In 2013, she was awarded the Norman Redlich Capital Defense Distinguished Service Award from the Committee on Capital Punishment of the New York City Bar Association.

Personal life and death
In 1955, she married Gerard Piel. Together they had a daughter.

Jackson Piel was born in Santa Monica, California. She died on November 26, 2022, at the age of 102.

References 

1920 births
2022 deaths
20th-century American women lawyers
20th-century American lawyers
American centenarians
People from Santa Monica, California
UC Berkeley School of Law alumni
Women centenarians